The Chief of the Navy is the head of the Naval operations and the administrative head in the Somali Navy, and is under the Chief of Armed Forces and the Ministry of Defence (Somalia). The current Chief of the Navy is Commodore Admiral Abdihamid Mohamed Dirir.

Chiefs of the Navy 
Somali Republic and Somali Democratic Republic (1960-1991)

 Transitional Government and Federal Republic of Somalia (2012 - present)

References 

Navy chiefs of staff
Somalian military leaders
Maritime history of Somalia
Somali admirals